Toms Fork is a tributary of the Meathouse Fork,  long, in north-central West Virginia in the United States.

Toms Fork's course is entirely in southern Doddridge County. Toms Fork is paralleled for most of its course by West Virginia Route 18. It collects its largest tributary, Little Toms Fork, at Market.

See also
List of rivers of West Virginia

References 

Rivers of West Virginia
Rivers of Doddridge County, West Virginia